HammerLock Wrestling is a professional wrestling game for the Super NES that was released in 1994. In Japan, this game was called .

Reception
GamePro described HammerLock Wrestling as "an interesting but confusing SNES game." They commented that the division of the screen into three horizontal windows, while aesthetically appealing, makes it hard to stay focused on the action, as well as severely limiting the movements of the wrestlers.

References

1994 video games
Jaleco games
Professional wrestling games
Super Nintendo Entertainment System games
Super Nintendo Entertainment System-only games
Fighting games
Video games developed in Japan
Multiplayer and single-player video games